M150 or M-150 may refer to:
 M150 Penetration Augmented Munition, an explosive device
 M150 ACOG, a telescopic rifle sight used by the United States Army
 M-150 (Michigan highway), a road in the United States
 M-150 (energy drink), an energy drink from Thailand